Mariedals IK is a Swedish football club located in Borås in Borås Municipality, Västra Götaland County.

Background
Mariedals IK began operating in Borås on 30 March 1931 under the name IK Söderhov. The name Mariedal appeared for the first time a year later, when a couple of school boys, Kurt Johansson and Rickard Ödéhn, started the boys' football section. At the same time IK Viking was active and later changed their name to Borås AIK. On 13 April 1938 the two clubs merged to form Mariedals IK. The club now specialises in football and table-tennis but its activities in the past have also included bandy and floorball.

Since their foundation Mariedals IK has participated mainly in the middle and lower divisions of the Swedish football league system.  The club currently plays in Division 3 Mellersta Götaland which is the fifth tier of Swedish football but have finished in a relegation position. They play their home matches at the Borås Arena or Kransmossens IP in Borås.

Mariedals IK are affiliated to the Västergötlands Fotbollförbund.

Season to season

Attendances

In recent seasons Mariedals IK have had the following average attendances:

Footnotes

External links
 Mariedals IK – Official website
  Mariedals IK Facebook

Football clubs in Västra Götaland County
Association football clubs established in 1938
1938 establishments in Sweden